Nu Herculis, Latinized from ν Herculis, is a binary and variable star in the constellation of Hercules. With an apparent magnitude of about 4.4, it is faintly visible to the naked eye. Parallax measurements made by the Hipparcos spacecraft put it at a distance of about 860 light years (260 parsecs).

The secondary is nearly three magnitudes fainter than the primary at magnitude 7.5, and is hotter than the primary with a spectral type of B9.5.

Nu Herculis's spectral type of F2 II means that it is an F-type bright giant, with a luminosity 799 times that of the Sun. Its effective temperature is 6,410 K, hotter than the Sun. Its mass is about 5.3 solar masses. It is a possible semiregular variable star with a range of about a tenth of a magnitude.  A period of 29 days has been derived.

References

Hercules (constellation)
Herculis, Nu
F-type bright giants
Herculis, 094
087998
164136
6707
Durchmusterung objects
Semiregular variable stars
Binary stars